Nara Burnu (Turkish "Cape Nara"), formerly Nağara Burnu, in English Nagara Point, and in older sources Point Pesquies, is a headland on the Anatolian side of the Dardanelles Straits, north of Çanakkale.

The ancient and medieval city of Abydos is located at the Nara promontory.

Due to the narrowness of the straits at this point, the site was often chosen for crossings of the Dardanelles by armies, beginning with the Achaemenid monarch Xerxes I during his Invasion of Greece in 480 BC, who deployed pontoon bridges to allow his army to cross on foot.

References

Dardanelles
Promontories
Geography of Çanakkale Province
Headlands of Turkey